AF, af, Af, etc. may refer to:

Arts and entertainment
A-F Records, an independent record label in Pittsburgh, Pennsylvania, US, founded by the band Anti-Flag
Almost Family episode titles tend to be "[Adjective] AF"

Businesses and organizations

European
 ÅF, a Swedish technical consulting company
 AF Gruppen, a multinational construction and development company based in Norway
 Académie française, the official institution responsible for overseeing the French language
 Action Française, a French far right political movement
 Air France (IATA airline code and Euronext stock symbol "AF")
 Anarchist Federation (British Isles), an Anarchist-Communist agitational organisation in Britain

International
 Abercrombie & Fitch, an American-based, international clothing retailer
 The Adaptation Fund, a UN organization responsible for climate change adaptation
 Adventist Forums, an organization of progressive Seventh-day Adventists
 Alliance Française, an international organization that aims to promote French language and culture

Elsewhere
 American Freightways, former American trucking company in 2006 merged into FedEx Freight

Language
 Académie française, the official institution responsible for overseeing the French language
 Alliance Française, an international organization that aims to promote French language and culture
 Acronym Finder, an online database of abbreviations (acronyms, initialisms, etc.)
 Afrikaans language (ISO 639-1 language code AF)
"...as fuck", meaning "very", in SMS language and internet messageboards

Military
 AF Guardian, a warplane of the US Navy
 Air force
 Armed forces

Places
 Afghanistan, by 2-letter ISO, FIPS 10-4 and obsolete NATO country code
 .af, the country code top-level domain for Afghanistan
 Agra Fort railway station, near Rawatpara, Agra, India
 American Fork, Utah, US

Science and technology

Acoustics and communications
 Amplify-and-Forward, a scheme of relay channel
 Alternative frequency
 Audio frequency

Units of measure
 Acre-feet, the quantity of water that covers one acre to a depth of one foot
 Attofarad, an SI unit of electric capacitance

Visual arts
 Autofocus, the ability of a camera to focus automatically
 Anisotropic filtering

Other uses in science and technology
 Af, the Köppen climate classification for a tropical rainforest climate
 Across flats (A/F), a measure of hexagonal nut flat size
 Advanced Format, a new disk format and access using sector sizes larger than 512 bytes
 Anaerobic filter, a type of anaerobic digester
 Arcuate fasciculus, a nerve bundle in the brain
 Atrial fibrillation, a form of cardiac arrhythmia

Other uses
 Alabama and Florida Railway (reporting mark AF)
 Anno Fascista, a year in the Italian Fascist calendar